Leatherbark may refer to:

Leatherbark, West Virginia, an unincorporated community
Leatherbark Run, a stream in West Virginia